Pseudophilautus  malcolmsmithi was a species of frog in the family Rhacophoridae.
It was endemic to Sri Lanka and only known to science from the holotype.

References

malcolmsmithi
Extinct amphibians
Amphibian extinctions since 1500
Frogs of Sri Lanka
Amphibians described in 1927
Taxonomy articles created by Polbot